Qianlong Tongbao (Vietnamese: Càn Long Thông Bảo) is an inscription used on cash coins produced under the reign of the Qianlong Emperor of the Qing dynasty. Initially the Qianlong Tongbao cash coins were equal to its predecessors in their weight and quality but as expensive military expenditures such as the Ten Great Campaigns began to take their financial toll on the government of the Qing dynasty the quality of these cash coins started to steadily decrease. The weight of the Qianlong Tongbao was changed several times and tin was added to their alloy to both reduce costs and to prevent people from melting down the coins to make utensils. As the intrinsic value of these coins was higher than their nominal value many provincial mints started reporting annual losses and were forced to close down, meanwhile the copper content of the coinage continued to be lowered while the copper mines of China were depleting. The Qianlong era also saw the conquest of Xinjiang and the introduction of cash coins to this new region of the Qing Empire.

As a reminder to the people of Xinjiang that the Manchus conquered the region one in five cash coins produced in that region after the death of the Qianlong Emperor was ordered to bear the inscription "Qianlong Tongbao" (Emperor Qianlong Money), as a consequence cash coins with this inscription continued to be produced until the end of the dynasty.

History 

During the first few years of the reign of the Qianlong Emperor China had suffered from a shortage of cash coins due to the contemporary scarcity of copper, but soon Yunnan's copper mines started producing a large surplus of copper allowing the Qing government to swiftly increase the money supply and minting more coins at a faster pace. The cash coins produced during this early period are similar in size and quality as the preceding Kangxi Tongbao (康熙通寶) and Yongzheng Tongbao (雍正通寶) cash coins, but over time the quality and size of the Qianlong Tongbao would deteriorate. Like the preceding Yongzheng Tongbao coinage all Qianlong Tongbao cash coins exclusively use Manchu mint marks characterised by the character "" (Boo) on the left side and the name of the issuing mint in the Manchu language on the right. A special characteristic of some Qianlong Tongbao cash coins is that the Chinese character "Long" (隆) at the bottom is sometimes written with a "Fou" (缶) instead of the usual "Sheng" (生).

The Qianlong era saw the founding of the Zhili mint in the city of Baoding (保定) as well as several mints in the newly conquered region of Xinjiang, some of these mints oversaw the production of "red cash coins" (紅錢) which were made of nearly pure copper. In the middle of the Qianlong era as much as 3,700,000 strings of cash were produced annually. Early Qianlong Tongbao cash coins contained no tin and were referred to as "yellow cash coins" (黃錢), however in 1740 2% tin was added and in 1741 coins were ordered to be made of an alloy of 50% copper, 41.5% zinc, 6.5% lead, and 2% tin to reduce the likelihood of people melting down coins to make utensils, did not allow to reuse the material because it would become brittle and objects would more easily break. All while the Qing government encouraged to sell their utensils to the state mints to be melted into coinage, these cash coins are commonly referred to as "green cash coins" (青錢) even though their colour appears to be just as yellow as the earlier cash coins. The production cost of these new Qianlong Tongbao cash coins was about 15% of the material value and their intrinsic value exceeded their nominal one. Yet in actuality not all provincial mints followed the imperial directive to change the alloy of the coinage and continued to produce the cheaper copper-zinc alloy which was used before. From this period onwards the Ministry of Public Works Mint manufactured 12,490 strings of cash coins annually (with 1,000 cash coins per string).

By the end of the Qianlong era Yunnan's copper mines started depleting the production of cash coins was lowered by the end of the Qianlong era, and the copper content was debased once more. 1794 all provincial mints were forced to close their doors, but subsequently reopened in 1796.

Qianlong coinage in Xinjiang

Pūl-based "red cash coins" in the Southern Circuit 

In the summer of 1759, the government of the Qing dynasty finished their conquest of Xinjiang, and Xinjiang was divided into three circuits: the Northern Circuit, Eastern Circuit, and Southern Circuit. In the Southern Circuit a different monetary system was used than in the other circuits, as this circuit had been Dzungaria the Dzungar pūl (ﭘول)  coin system was retained, these pūl coins composed of 99% copper, these new pūl coins were modeled after the Qianlong Tongbao cash coins, but due to their high copper content were red in colour hence they were known as "red cash coins" (紅錢) however the Qing government now faced the fact that the amount of copper ore available in the region was very little, in order to get the amount of copper needed to manufacture these "red cash coins", General Zhao Hui requested to the Qianlong Emperor in his July 1759 petition if he was allowed to reclaim old pūl coins from the locals to use as scrap metal and cast these new "red cash coins" from. These "red cash coins" had an official exchange rate with the pūl coins that remained in circulation of 1 "red cash" for 2 pūl coins. As Zhao Hui wanted the new can coins to have the same weight as pūl coins they weighed 2 qián (or 7.46 grams) and had both a higher width and thickness than regular cash coins. Red cash coins are also generally marked by their rather crude craftsmanship when compared to the cash coins of China proper. The edges of these coins are often not filed completely and the casting technique is often inaccurate or the inscriptions on them seemed deformed. As the copper used to make these new Qianlong Tongbao cash coins was melted from copper ore or scrap copper by local primitive methods. Therefore, the actual pure copper content in "red cash coins" is usually around 98%, the remaining 2% usually being lead, zinc, and other impurities which were all beyond skills of the local mint technicians in Xinjiang to remove. Sometimes due to circulation or due to corrosion the slag kernels or organic impurities in the body of a particular "red cash coin" would decompose or wear out and would form a comb-like cluster of very small see-through openings which the Chinese refer to as "sand eyes".

At the introduction of red cash system in Southern Xinjiang in 1760, the exchange rate of standard cash (or "yellow cash") and "red cash" was set at 10 standard cash coins were worth 1 "red cash coin". During two or three subsequent years this exchange rate was decreased to 5:1. When used in the Northern or Eastern circuits of Xinjiang, the "red cash coins" were considered equal in value as the standard cash coins that circulated there. The areas where the Dzungar pūls had most circulated such as Yarkant, Hotan, and Kashgar were the sites of mints operated by the Qing government, as the official mint of the Dzungar Khanate was in the city of Yarkent the Qing used this mint to cast the new "red cash coins" and new mints were established in Aksu and Ili. The Yarkant Mint opened its doors in September 1760 and employed 99 people of which 8 were ethnic Han supervisors who were mint workers from the provincial mint of Shaanxi. These Han employees from Shaanxi also brought 2 full sets of both casting and melting equipment with them to aid production. Not only reclaimed pūl coins were used for the production of "red cash coins" as also equipment from the military was used. According to David Hartill the first Qianlong Tongbao cash coins produced at the Yarkant Mint were intended to be a present for the Qianlong Emperor.

The Western cities of the Southern Circuit were poor in natural copper sources and required the reclamation of pūl coins for the production of cash coins while in the Eastern cities of the Southern Circuit such as Aksu, Karashar, Kucha, and Turpan copper was more easily acquired as this area was rich in copper ore. Because of this the government of the Qing dynasty opened a massive mint with six furnaces and employing 360 workers in the city of Aksu in the year 1761, among its employees were technicians sent to oversee the coin production brought in from the mints of the Gansu and Shaanxi provinces. Other than using the copper ore acquired from the region to produce Qianlong Tongbao cash coins, the Aksu Mint also used copper the government accepted as a form of taxation from the population of the eastern part of the Southern city as well as the begs of Aksu. The weight of the Qianlong Tongbao cash coins produced in Aksu was identical to those produced in Yarkent, but they mostly circulated exclusively within the eastern part of the Southern Circuit. After a Muslim uprising against Qing rule occurred in the year 1765 the Qianlong Emperor decreed that a large number of soldiers should go to Turfan. Turfan was later proclaimed to be the administrative capital of the Southern Circuit and in 1766 the Aksu Mint was relocated to Turfan. In 1769 the Yarkent Mint closed its doors and Turfan became the only mint in operation in the Southern Circuit. Initially the "red cash coins" produced in Turfan were the same weight as those previously produced in Yarkant and Aksu but as the supply of copper decreased the weight to 5.595 grams of these Qianlong Tongbao cash coins also decreased in the year 1771, in 1774 this was even further decreased to only 4.476 grams making it equal with the "yellow cash coins" of China proper and Northern Xinjiang. Even in the face of these weight reductions the actual weight of "red cash coins" manufactured in Turfan tended to be around 3.5 grams.

Cash coins in the Northern and Eastern Circuits of Xinjiang 

As the Northern and Eastern Circuits of Xinjiang were mostly inhabited with bartering nomads who did not have a monetary tradition the government of the Qing dynasty did not force these peoples to adopt the monetary system of China. These regions also saw an influx of immigrants from China proper who brought with them their own money and in the Eastern Circuit the local population had already adopted the Chinese monetary culture prior to its conquest by the Qing dynasty so these two circuits would use the same type of cash coins as were used in China proper and did not have to adopt a completely different monetary system. Cash coins from China proper flowed in large numbers to these regions.

The first mint in the Northern Circuit was opened in the city of Yining which was both the military and administrative of the region. It is unclear whether the Yining Mint opened in 1764 (as argued by the Chinese numismatist Ding Fubao) or in 1775. The Yining Mint had a total of twenty-one buildings and its technical staff included two employees from Shaanxi who supervised the local production of Qianlong Tongbao cash coins in Yining. Generally the cash produced by the Yining Mint were of the same weight and size as found in the rest of China and also used the same alloys, but the copper content of Yining cash coins was occasionally higher and the weight of these coins often exceeded the national standard and could weigh more than 5 grams. In the year 1776 a large amount of copper ore was discovered in the proximity of Yining city leading to an increased output of the Yining Mint.

Qianlong Tongbao cash coins produced in Xinjiang after the Qianlong era 

As the Qianlong Emperor ordered in 1775 that 20% of all cash coins cast in Xinjiang should bear the inscription "Qianlong Tongbao" even after the end of his reign as an "eternal reminder" of the Manchu conquest of the region, for this reason the majority of "red cash coins" with this inscription were actually produced after the Qianlong era as their production lasted until the fall of the Qing dynasty in 1911 making many of them hard to attribute. Under the Jiaqing Emperor the cash coins produced by the Aksu Mint continued using the description "Qianlong Tongbao" and made up 20% of all cash coins produced in this era in Aksu. The ratio of Qianlong Tongbao cash coins produced in Xinjiang after the death of the Qianlong Emperor increased at certain times to 30% or even 40%. As so many Qianlong Tongbao cash coins were produced in Xinjiang until 1911 the vast majority of Xinjiang cash coins with this inscription were produced after the Qianlong period.

Changes in the manufacturing process 

Ancestor coins also known as engraved mother coins were introduced around 1730 during the Qianlong period in middle of the eighteenth century to improve the quality control of mother coins, these ancestor coins were used to cast more mother coins and from a single ancestor thousands of mother coins could be cast. The production process of making mother coins with ancestor coins was the same as it was for the casting of circulation coins from mother coins, however these coins were usually only produced for a new reign title, when preparing to cast new cash coins with new inscriptions for a recently ascended emperor, a mint would first engrave an ancestor coin out of fine brass which would form the basis for mother coins. The introduction of ancestor coins under the Manchu Qing dynasty lead to all mints having more consistently produced coinages and smaller variations between the coins produced by separate mints in both inscription (or legend) as well as in quality.

Mint marks 

List of mint marks:

Qianlong Tongbao charms 

There is a type of Chinese numismatic charm with the inscription Qianlong Tongbao which might have been cast during the reign of the Qianlong Emperor which is 56 millimeters in diameter and has a thickness of just slightly more than 3 millimeters. The Chinese characters of this amulet are also different style from those of circulating Qianlong Tongbao cash coins, such as the bottom part of the "Bao" (寶) and the radical portion of the "Tong" (通). The Manchu characters on the reverse side of this amulet indicate that it was manufactured at the Ministry of Revenue Mint in Beijing. However, these Manchu characters appear to be very large compared to other Manchu mint marks and are rotated 90 degrees clockwise. The intention of this may have had political motivations but the meaning of why this was done remains unclear today.

Another method how Qianlong Tongbao cash coins are used as charms is by stringing them together in the shape of a sword, these amulets are referred to as "Chinese coin swords", these Chinese coin swords consist of either one or two iron rods which are used as their foundation and the Qianlong Tongbao coins (but sometimes other inscriptions may also be used) are fastened with a red string, cord, or wire. A Chinese coin sword is usually about 60 centimeter long and typically consists of around one hundred bronze Chinese cash coins. One of these Chinese coin swords made with Qianlong Tongbao cash coins is in the collection of the British Museum.

Battle of Ngọc Hồi-Đống Đa issues 

After the Tây Sơn Rebellion ousted the Revival Lê dynasty from Northern Vietnam the Qianlong Emperor ordered his armies to invade Annam (Vietnam) and restore the Revival Lê dynasty. This army would be commanded by the Viceroy of Liangguang, Sun Shiyi (孫士毅). Two armies invaded Vietnam in November 1788 with one army composed of Guangdongers marching in from Guangxi and another one entering from Yunnan lead by General Wu Dajing (烏大經), these armies would team up with Vietnamese soldiers loyal to the Later Lê dynasty. These armies would easily defeat the Tây Sơn dynasty at several battles and took Thăng Long (modern Hanoi) on November 19, 1788, reinstating Emperor Lê Chiêu Thống (黎昭統). After the forces of the Quang Trung Emperor (光中帝) retook Hanoi and expelled the Chinese and Revival Lê forces back over the Chinese border the Viceroy of Yungui, Fu Gangan (富綱安) was chosen to head the army and marched back into Vietnam and concluded a truce recognising the revolutionary government. During this episode special Qianlong Tongbao cash coins were cast in the province of Yunnan as payment for the Chinese troops who engaged in this invasion which featured the characters "安南" (The Pacified South) on their reverse.

See also 

 List of Chinese cash coins by inscription

Notes

References

Sources 

 Hartill, David (September 22, 2005). Cast Chinese Coins. Trafford, United Kingdom: Trafford Publishing. .
 Hartill, David, Qing cash, Royal Numismatic Society Special Publication 37, London, 2003.

External links 

 Qianlongtongbao.com, a website dedicated to cash coins with this inscription. (in Mandarin Chinese)

 

Coins of China
Economy of the Qing dynasty
Chinese numismatics
Cash coins by inscription